Pope Shenouda II of Alexandria was the 65th Pope of Alexandria and Patriarch of the See of St. Mark.

References 

11th-century Coptic Orthodox popes of Alexandria
1046 deaths